Etcetera is the eighth album by saxophonist Wayne Shorter, recorded on June 14, 1965 but not released on Blue Note until 1980. The album features four originals by Shorter and an arrangement of Gil Evans' "Barracudas" performed by a quartet with pianist Herbie Hancock, bassist Cecil McBee and drummer Joe Chambers.

Reception
The Allmusic review by Stacia Proefrock awarded the album 4½ stars stating "The low-key nature of the album as a whole, especially the title track, might have contributed to Blue Note's lack of attention, but there are definitely gems here, especially the closing track, 'Indian Song.' At times the rest of the album seems like a warm-up for that amazing tune, where Shorter swirls around in a hypnotizing dance with Herbie Hancock's piano, grounded by the nocturnal bass of Cecil McBee and the airy structure of Joe Chambers' drumming. The short, repetitive themes and passionate, soulful playing echo John Coltrane, but this quartet has its own flavor, and the perfect, intricate web they weave here helps pull the whole session up to a higher level."

Track listing 
All compositions by Wayne Shorter except where noted.

 "Etcetera" – 6:21
 "Penelope" – 6:46
 "Toy Tune" – 7:24
 "Barracudas (General Assembly)" (Evans) – 11:07
 "Indian Song" – 11:35

Personnel 
Wayne Shorter – tenor saxophone
Herbie Hancock – piano
Cecil McBee – bass
Joe Chambers – drums

References 

1980 albums
Blue Note Records albums
Wayne Shorter albums
Albums produced by Alfred Lion
Albums recorded at Van Gelder Studio